The NASA Equal Employment Opportunity Medal is an award given to both government employees and non-government personnel for outstanding achievement and material contribution to the goals of NASA’s Equal Employment Opportunity Programs either within government, community organizations, or groups.

See also 
List of NASA awards

External links
 NASA awards
 National Aeronautics and Space Administration Honor Awards (1969-1978)

Equal Employment Opportunity Medal
Equal employment opportunity